The 2003 Memorial Cup (branded as the 2003 Mastercard Memorial Cup for sponsorship reasons) occurred May 17–25 at the Colisée Pepsi in Quebec City, Quebec.  It was the 85th annual Memorial Cup competition and determined the major junior ice hockey champion of the Canadian Hockey League (CHL).  It featured the host team, the Quebec Remparts, as well as the winners of the Ontario Hockey League, Quebec Major Junior Hockey League and the Western Hockey League, which were the Kitchener Rangers, Hull Olympiques and the Kelowna Rockets respectively. The Kitchener Rangers won their second ever Memorial Cup, their first being in 1982. They beat the Hull Olympiques in the final, who were trying to win their first Memorial Cup since 1997 when they won it on home ice.

Round-robin standings

Scores
May 17: Kitchener 4–3 Quebec
May 18: Hull 4–1 Kelowna
May 19: Kelowna 3–2 Quebec
May 20: Kitchener 4–1 Hull
May 21: Kitchener 4–2 Kelowna
May 22: Hull 5–3 Quebec

Semi-final
May 24: Hull 2–1 Kelowna

Final
May 25: Kitchener 6–3 Hull

Winning team
Andre Benoit, Jesse Boucher, Gregory Campbell, Mike Chmielewski, David Clarkson, Scott Dickie, Carlo DiRienzo, Nick Duff, T. J. Eason, Steve Eminger, Cam Fergus, Matt Grennier, George Halkidis, Thomas Harrison, Kevin Hurley, Petr Kanko, Adam Keefe, Matt Manias, Rafal Martynowski, Chad McCaffrey, Matt McCann, Paul McFarland, Evan McGrath, Nathan O'Nabigon, Mike Richards, Derek Roy (Captain), Marcus Smith. Head Coach: Peter DeBoer

Scoring leaders
Gregory Campbell, KIT (1g, 6a, 7pts)
Jean-Michel Daoust, HUL (2g, 4a, 6pts)
Andre Benoit, KIT (1g, 5a, 6pts)
Petr Kanko, KIT (4g, 1a, 5pts)
Mathieu Brunelle, HUL (3g, 2a, 5pts)
Mike Richards, KIT (2g, 3a, 5pts)
Jesse Schultz, KEL (1g, 4a, 5pts)
Derek Roy, KIT (3g, 1a, 4pts)
Evan McGrath, KIT (2g, 2a, 4pts)
Kiel McLeod, KEL (2g, 2a, 4pts)

Goaltending leaders
Scott Dickie, KIT (2.25 gaa, 0.911 sv%)
Eric Lafrance, HUL (3.00 gaa, 0.907 sv%)
Kelly Guard, KEL (3.02 gaa, 0.862 sv%)
Jean-Michel Filiatrault, QUE (3.71 gaa, 0.894 sv%)
Michael Kim, KEL (2.21 gaa, 0.931 sv%)

Award winners
Stafford Smythe Memorial Trophy (MVP): Derek Roy, Kitchener
George Parsons Trophy (Sportsmanship): Gregory Campbell, Kitchener
Hap Emms Memorial Trophy (Goaltender): Scott Dickie, Kitchener
Ed Chynoweth Trophy (Leading Scorer): Gregory Campbell, Kitchener

All-star team
Goal: Scott Dickie, Kitchener
Defence: Steve Eminger, Kitchener; Doug O'Brien, Hull
Forwards: Derek Roy, Kitchener; Gregory Campbell, Kitchener; Mike Richards, Kitchener

References

External links
 Memorial Cup 
 Canadian Hockey League

Memorial Cup 2003
Memorial Cup tournaments
Ice hockey in Quebec City
2003 in Quebec
2000s in Quebec City